Thammaca is a genus of South American jumping spiders that was first described by Eugène Louis Simon in 1901.  it contains only two species, found only in Peru and Brazil: T. coriacea and T. nigritarsis.

References

Salticidae genera
Salticidae
Spiders of South America